The Nvidia GoForce was a line of chipsets that was used mainly in handheld devices such as PDAs and mobile phones. Nvidia acquired graphics display processor firm MediaQ in 2003, and rebranded the division as GoForce. It has since been replaced by the Nvidia Tegra series of SoCs.

Features

GoForce 2100 
Featuring VGA image capture, 2D graphics acceleration, JPEG support, and MJPEG acceleration. Used in the Samsung SCH-M500 Palm OS based flip-phone.

GoForce 2150
Featuring 1.3-megapixel camera support, JPEG support, and 2D graphics acceleration.
Supports 3-megapixel images with the upgrade.

GoForce 3000/GoForce 4000
The GoForce 4000 supports 3.0-megapixel camera and MPEG-4/H.263 codec, whilst GoForce 3000 is a low-cost version of the GoForce 4000 with limited features.

GoForce 4500
Features 3D graphics support with a geometry processor and programmable pixel shaders, used in the Gizmondo device.

GoForce 4800
Supports 3.0-megapixel camera and a 3D graphics engine.

GoForce 5500
The GoForce 5500 is a multimedia processor, incorporates Tensilica Xtensa HiFi 2 Audio Engine (based on the Xtensa LX processor licensed in 2005). It can decode video and audio formats, such as WMV, WMA, MP3, MP4, MPEG, JPEG and supports H.264. Also including a 24-bit 64-voice sound processor with supports up to 32 MB of external memory, 10-megapixel camera support, and 3D graphics engine version 2.

GoForce 5300
Equipped with 2.25 MiB embedded DRAM (eDRAM) on TSMC's 65 nm process, being the first in the GoForce product line. Its multimedia technology is claimed to be similar to the 5500's, but it does not sport a 3D engine and only supports much smaller screens.

GoForce 6100
The latest chipset in the series, the GoForce 6100 (showcased in 2007), claiming the first applications processor by NVIDIA, adds 10-megapixel camera support and integrated 802.11b/g support (with external RF), based on a 130 nm process. It contains a 250 MHz ARM1176JZ-S core.

Implementations

Acer N300 PDA
HTC Foreseer
Gizmondo
iMate Ultimate 6150
iMate Ultimate 8150
iRiver G10
Kyocera W41K
Kyocera W51K
Kyocera W52k
LG KC 8100
Mitsubishi M900
Motorola E770v
Motorola RAZR V3x
Motorola RAZR V3xx
Motorola RAZR2 V9
Motorola RAZR maxx V6
O2 Xda Flame
Samsung i310
Samsung SGH-P910
Samsung SGH-P940
Samsung Sync SGH-A707
Sandisk Sansa View
Sendo X
Sharp EM-ONE S01SH
SimCom S788
Sony Ericsson W900
Toshiba Portege G900

See also
Imageon
Nvidia Tegra

References

External links
 Nvidia's GoForce Product Page

Graphics cards
Nvidia products